The 2010 Welsh International Open was a professional bowls tournament. It was held between 30 January and 5 February 2010 at the City & County of Swansea Indoor Bowls Club,
Swansea, Wales.

Darren Burnett won in the final 9-4, 9-5 against Simon Skelton.

Seeds

  Robert Chisholm (first round)
  Alex Marshall (second round)
  Mark Royal (second round)
  Paul Foster (second round)
  Greg Harlow (first round)
  David Gourlay (first round)
  Jason Greenslade (first round)
  Andy Thomson (first round)
  Mervyn King (quarter-finals)
  Robert Weale (semi-finals)
  Billy Jackson (second round)
  Kelvin Kerkow (first round)
  Ian Bond (quarter-finals)
  Les Gillett (first round)
  Simon Skelton (runner-up)
  Darren Burnett (champion)

Main draw

References

External links
Official site
City & County of Swansea Indoor Bowls Club official site

Bowls in Wales
Welsh International Open